Southwest 6th & Pine and Southwest 5th & Oak stations are a pair of light rail stations on the MAX Green, Orange and Yellow Lines in Portland, Oregon. It is the 3rd stop southbound on the Portland Transit Mall extension.

The stations are built into the sidewalks of 5th and 6th Avenues, with the 5th Avenue platform served by southbound trains and the 6th Avenue platform by  northbound trains. The SW 6th & Pine station is served only by the Green and Yellow Lines, and the SW 5th & Oak station is served only by the Green and Orange Lines.  Originally, from the opening of these stations in 2009 until 2015, the Yellow Line served both, but in September 2015 the then-new Orange Line replaced the Yellow Line at all southbound stations on the transit mall. The stations are located at the base of the US Bancorp Tower and connect to bus routes on the Transit Mall.

At the time of their opening in August 2009, the stations were located in Fareless Square, which in January 2010 was renamed the Free Rail Zone.  In 2012, the fare-free zone was discontinued, along with all fare zones on the TriMet system.

External links
SW 5th & Oak station information from TriMet
SW 6th & Pine station information from TriMet
MAX Light Rail Stations – more general TriMet page

MAX Light Rail double stations
MAX Green Line
MAX Yellow Line
Railway stations in the United States opened in 2009
2009 establishments in Oregon
Railway stations in Portland, Oregon